Gopura Vasalile is a 1991 Indian Tamil-language black comedy film directed by Priyadarshan, starring Karthik and Bhanupriya. It relies on various subplots from the Malayalam film Pavam Pavam Rajakumaran (1990) and the Hindi film Chashme Buddoor (1981). The film was released on 22 March 1991.

Plot

Cast

 Karthik as Manohar
 Bhanupriya as Kalyani
 Suchitra as Kasthuri
 Nassar as Manohar's friend
 Janagaraj as Pethaperumal
 Charle as Manohar's friend
 Junior Balaiah as Manohar's friend
 V. K. Ramasamy as Kalyani's father
 Nagesh
 Sukumari as Manohar's mother
 Poornam Viswanathan
 Mohanlal as the accordionist in the song "Keladi En" (Cameo appearance)

Production
Malayalam director Priyadarshan was to have made his Tamil debut with the film Chinnamanikkuyile, which never saw a theatrical release. As a result, Gopura Vasalile became his Tamil debut. It is also the first appearance of Malayalam actor Mohanlal in a Tamil film.

Soundtrack
The soundtrack was composed by Ilaiyaraaja. The song "Thalattum Poongkaatru" is set in the raga Simhendramadhyamam.

Notes

References

External links 
 
 

1990s black comedy films
1990s Tamil-language films
1991 films
1991 romantic comedy films
Films directed by Priyadarshan
Films scored by Ilaiyaraaja
Indian black comedy films
Indian romantic comedy films